Luzair - Transportes Aéreos, S.A. was an airline based in Lisbon, Portugal, specializing in wet lease and ad hoc charter operations. 

It was founded in 1997. In 2000, Luzair developed into an airline consulting and brokerage business. It operated a Lockheed L-1011 TriStar until 2008 and a Boeing 767. Luzair suspended operations in January 2011. Plans to resume business in early 2012 did not materialize.

References

External links
 
 Luzair

Defunct airlines of Portugal
Airlines established in 1997
Airlines disestablished in 2011
Portuguese companies established in 1997